Turner may refer to:

People and fictional characters
Turner (surname), a common surname, including a list of people and fictional characters with the name
Turner (given name), a list of people with the given name
One who uses a lathe for turning
Sean and Dorothy Turner are the protagonists of Servant as is their infant "son" Jericho.

Places

Australia
Turner, Australian Capital Territory
Turner River, Western Australia

Canada
Turner, Ontario

United States
Turner, Mississippi County, Arkansas
Turner, Phillips County, Arkansas
Turner, former name of Tuttle, California
Turner, Indiana
Turner, Kansas
Turner, Maine, a New England town
Turner (CDP), Maine, within the town of Turner
Turner, Michigan
Turner, Montana
Turner, Oregon
Turner, Washington
Turner, West Virginia
Turner Air Force Base, outside Albany, Georgia
Turner County, Georgia
Turner County, South Dakota

Businesses
Turner Broadcasting System, part of WarnerMedia, managed a collection of cable networks and properties
TBS (American TV channel), a channel owned by Turner Broadcasting System (now owned by Warner Bros. Discovery Networks U.S.); originally an abbreviation for its parent company
TNT (American TV network) a channel owned by Turner Broadcasting System (now owned by Warner Bros. Discovery Networks U.S.); originally an abbreviation for "Turner Network Television"
Turner Classic Movies (TCM), a channel formerly owned by Turner Broadcasting system; now owned by its sister company, Warner Bros. Entertainment
Turner Entertainment, a media company founded by Ted Turner
Turner Home Entertainment, a home media distribution division of Turner Entertainment
Turner Pictures, a former production company division of Turner Entertainment
Turner Feature Animation,  a former animated film production company division of Turner Entertainment
Turner Program Services, a former syndication arm of Turner Broadcasting
Turner Sports Cars, a British specialist sports car manufacturer
Turner Manufacturing Company, a British engineering company that made the Turner-Miesse steam car, Turner diesel, and Turner winch
Turner Construction, a New York City-based construction company

Turner Suspension Bicycles, an American bicycle frame manufacturer
Turner Publishing Company, an American independent book publisher based in Nashville, Tennessee

Other uses
, several American naval ships
Turner (crater), a small lunar impact crater near the Moon's equator
Turner Prize, an annual prize presented to a British visual artist
Turner Museum of Glass
Turner Stadium, a football (soccer) stadium in Be'er Sheva, Israel
Turner, a 1994 verse novel by David Dabydeen
A kitchen utensil closely related to a spatula

See also
Turner Falls
Turner Glacier
Turner Hills
Turner syndrome
Turner Township (disambiguation)
Turner Valley
Turners, German Americans organized in athletic and political gymnastic unions
Turners, Missouri